The Irkutsk Constituency (No.93) is a Russian legislative constituency in Irkutsk Oblast. It was previously located entirely in metropolitan Irkutsk, however during 2016 reconfiguration the constituency was pushed from Irkutsk to the central Irkutsk Oblast and even parts of former Ust-Orda Buryat Autonomous Okrug, which had its own constituency in 1993-2007.

Members elected

Election results

1993

|-
! colspan=2 style="background-color:#E9E9E9;text-align:left;vertical-align:top;" |Candidate
! style="background-color:#E9E9E9;text-align:left;vertical-align:top;" |Party
! style="background-color:#E9E9E9;text-align:right;" |Votes
! style="background-color:#E9E9E9;text-align:right;" |%
|-
|style="background-color:"|
|align=left|Yury Ten
|align=left|Independent
|54,736
|26.83%
|-
|style="background-color:"|
|align=left|Yury Shevelev
|align=left|Independent
| -
|21.00%
|-
| colspan="5" style="background-color:#E9E9E9;"|
|- style="font-weight:bold"
| colspan="3" style="text-align:left;" | Total
| 204,042
| 100%
|-
| colspan="5" style="background-color:#E9E9E9;"|
|- style="font-weight:bold"
| colspan="4" |Source:
|
|}

1995

|-
! colspan=2 style="background-color:#E9E9E9;text-align:left;vertical-align:top;" |Candidate
! style="background-color:#E9E9E9;text-align:left;vertical-align:top;" |Party
! style="background-color:#E9E9E9;text-align:right;" |Votes
! style="background-color:#E9E9E9;text-align:right;" |%
|-
|style="background-color:#23238E"|
|align=left|Yury Ten (incumbent)
|align=left|Our Home – Russia
|109,794
|48.62%
|-
|style="background-color:"|
|align=left|Anton Romanov
|align=left|Independent
|36,396
|16.12%
|-
|style="background-color:"|
|align=left|Gennady Alekseyev
|align=left|Independent
|20,002
|8.86%
|-
|style="background-color:#2C299A"|
|align=left|Valery Khayryuzov
|align=left|Congress of Russian Communities
|13,427
|5.95%
|-
|style="background-color:#A8A821"|
|align=left|Aleksandr Lukin
|align=left|Stable Russia
|6,300
|2.79%
|-
|style="background-color:"|
|align=left|Natalya Noskova
|align=left|Liberal Democratic Party
|6,266
|2.77%
|-
|style="background-color:"|
|align=left|Vladimir Shipov
|align=left|Serving Russia
|5,066
|2.24%
|-
|style="background-color:#FFF22E"|
|align=left|Andrey Kunitsyn
|align=left|Beer Lovers Party
|3,029
|1.34%
|-
|style="background-color:"|
|align=left|Ivan Grudinin
|align=left|Independent
|2,473
|1.10%
|-
|style="background-color:"|
|align=left|Boris Artemyev
|align=left|Independent
|1,058
|0.47%
|-
|style="background-color:#000000"|
|colspan=2 |against all
|18,082
|8.01%
|-
| colspan="5" style="background-color:#E9E9E9;"|
|- style="font-weight:bold"
| colspan="3" style="text-align:left;" | Total
| 225,807
| 100%
|-
| colspan="5" style="background-color:#E9E9E9;"|
|- style="font-weight:bold"
| colspan="4" |Source:
|
|}

1999

|-
! colspan=2 style="background-color:#E9E9E9;text-align:left;vertical-align:top;" |Candidate
! style="background-color:#E9E9E9;text-align:left;vertical-align:top;" |Party
! style="background-color:#E9E9E9;text-align:right;" |Votes
! style="background-color:#E9E9E9;text-align:right;" |%
|-
|style="background-color:#23238E"|
|align=left|Yury Ten (incumbent)
|align=left|Our Home – Russia
|37,573
|16.75%
|-
|style="background-color:#3B9EDF"|
|align=left|Geliy Zherebtsov
|align=left|Fatherland – All Russia
|32,326
|14.41%
|-
|style="background-color:"|
|align=left|Yevgeny Polyntsev
|align=left|Independent
|31,931
|14.23%
|-
|style="background-color:"|
|align=left|Vera Savchuk
|align=left|Communist Party
|31,230
|13.92%
|-
|style="background-color:"|
|align=left|Gennady Istomin
|align=left|Independent
|19,303
|8.60%
|-
|style="background-color:"|
|align=left|Yury Shevelev
|align=left|Independent
|13,717
|6.11%
|-
|style="background-color:"|
|align=left|Anton Romanov
|align=left|Independent
|13,399
|5.97%
|-
|style="background-color:"|
|align=left|Anatoly Khromykh
|align=left|Yabloko
|9,426
|4.20%
|-
|style="background-color:"|
|align=left|Nikolay Oskirko
|align=left|Liberal Democratic Party
|4,261
|1.90%
|-
|style="background-color:#7C273A"|
|align=left|Valery Khayryuzov
|align=left|Movement in Support of the Army
|3,206
|1.43%
|-
|style="background-color:#084284"|
|align=left|Yury Repkin
|align=left|Spiritual Heritage
|378
|0.17%
|-
|style="background-color:#000000"|
|colspan=2 |against all
|24,470
|10.91%
|-
| colspan="5" style="background-color:#E9E9E9;"|
|- style="font-weight:bold"
| colspan="3" style="text-align:left;" | Total
| 224,365
| 100%
|-
| colspan="5" style="background-color:#E9E9E9;"|
|- style="font-weight:bold"
| colspan="4" |Source:
|
|}

2003

|-
! colspan=2 style="background-color:#E9E9E9;text-align:left;vertical-align:top;" |Candidate
! style="background-color:#E9E9E9;text-align:left;vertical-align:top;" |Party
! style="background-color:#E9E9E9;text-align:right;" |Votes
! style="background-color:#E9E9E9;text-align:right;" |%
|-
|style="background-color:"|
|align=left|Sergey Dubrovin
|align=left|Independent
|57,824
|22.52%
|-
|style="background-color:"|
|align=left|Sergey Levchenko
|align=left|Communist Party
|44,296
|17.25%
|-
|style="background-color:"|
|align=left|Anton Romanov
|align=left|Independent
|25,028
|9.75%
|-
|style="background-color:"|
|align=left|Konstantin Volkov
|align=left|Independent
|19,279
|7.51%
|-
|style="background-color:"|
|align=left|Yury Korenev
|align=left|Independent
|13,979
|5.44%
|-
|style="background-color:"|
|align=left|Aleksandr Balashov
|align=left|Yabloko
|12,663
|4.93%
|-
|style="background-color:#00A1FF"|
|align=left|Andrey Kuzin
|align=left|Party of Russia's Rebirth-Russian Party of Life
|11,648
|4.54%
|-
|style="background-color:"|
|align=left|Yelena Safonova
|align=left|Independent
|10,742
|4.18%
|-
|style="background-color:"|
|align=left|Nikolay Kuryanovich
|align=left|Liberal Democratic Party
|8,503
|3.31%
|-
|style="background-color:"|
|align=left|Aleksandr Turik
|align=left|Independent
|7,132
|2.78%
|-
|style="background-color:"|
|align=left|Ildus Galyautdinov
|align=left|Independent
|3,498
|1.36%
|-
|style="background-color:"|
|align=left|Nikolay Oskirko
|align=left|Independent
|2,779
|1.08%
|-
|style="background-color:"|
|align=left|Oleg Gendin
|align=left|Independent
|2,691
|1.05%
|-
|style="background-color:#000000"|
|colspan=2 |against all
|33,480
|13.04%
|-
| colspan="5" style="background-color:#E9E9E9;"|
|- style="font-weight:bold"
| colspan="3" style="text-align:left;" | Total
| 257,096
| 100%
|-
| colspan="5" style="background-color:#E9E9E9;"|
|- style="font-weight:bold"
| colspan="4" |Source:
|
|}

2016

|-
! colspan=2 style="background-color:#E9E9E9;text-align:left;vertical-align:top;" |Candidate
! style="background-color:#E9E9E9;text-align:left;vertical-align:top;" |Party
! style="background-color:#E9E9E9;text-align:right;" |Votes
! style="background-color:#E9E9E9;text-align:right;" |%
|-
|style="background-color:"|
|align=left|Mikhail Shchapov
|align=left|Communist Party
|60,604
|34.45%
|-
|style="background-color:"|
|align=left|Oleg Kankov
|align=left|United Russia
|53,473
|30.40%
|-
|style="background-color:"|
|align=left|Larisa Yegorova
|align=left|A Just Russia
|16,616
|9.45%
|-
|style="background-color:"|
|align=left|Viktor Galitskov
|align=left|Liberal Democratic Party
|13,800
|7.85%
|-
|style="background:;"| 
|align=left|Yury Kankov
|align=left|Civic Platform
|4,235
|2.41%
|-
|style="background-color:"|
|align=left|Maksim Yevdokimov
|align=left|Rodina
|3,972
|2.26%
|-
|style="background:"| 
|align=left|Sergey Bespalov
|align=left|People's Freedom Party
|3,878
|2.20%
|-
|style="background-color:"|
|align=left|Larisa Kazakova
|align=left|Yabloko
|3,816
|2.17%
|-
|style="background: "| 
|align=left|Viktor Yemelyanov
|align=left|The Greens
|3,061
|1.74%
|-
|style="background:;"| 
|align=left|Aleksandr Ilyin
|align=left|Party of Growth
|2,441
|1.39%
|-
|style="background:"| 
|align=left|Sergey Yakubov
|align=left|Patriots of Russia
|1,712
|0.97%
|-
| colspan="5" style="background-color:#E9E9E9;"|
|- style="font-weight:bold"
| colspan="3" style="text-align:left;" | Total
| 175,905
| 100%
|-
| colspan="5" style="background-color:#E9E9E9;"|
|- style="font-weight:bold"
| colspan="4" |Source:
|
|}

2021

|-
! colspan=2 style="background-color:#E9E9E9;text-align:left;vertical-align:top;" |Candidate
! style="background-color:#E9E9E9;text-align:left;vertical-align:top;" |Party
! style="background-color:#E9E9E9;text-align:right;" |Votes
! style="background-color:#E9E9E9;text-align:right;" |%
|-
|style="background-color:"|
|align=left|Mikhail Shchapov (incumbent)
|align=left|Communist Party
|93,083
|50.77%
|-
|style="background-color:"|
|align=left|Roman Yefremov
|align=left|United Russia
|32,563
|17.76%
|-
|style="background-color:"|
|align=left|Aleksandr Deyev
|align=left|New People
|14,384
|7.85%
|-
|style="background-color:"|
|align=left|Andrey Dukhovnikov
|align=left|Liberal Democratic Party
|9,978
|5.44%
|-
|style="background-color: " |
|align=left|Aleksandr Druzenko
|align=left|A Just Russia — For Truth
|9,497
|5.18%
|-
|style="background-color: "|
|align=left|Roman Kuznetsov
|align=left|Party of Pensioners
|7,961
|4.34%
|-
|style="background:;"| 
|align=left|Dmitry Boyarsky
|align=left|Civic Platform
|4,466
|2.44%
|-
|style="background-color:"|
|align=left|Pavel Kharitonenko
|align=left|Yabloko
|2,705
|1.48%
|-
| colspan="5" style="background-color:#E9E9E9;"|
|- style="font-weight:bold"
| colspan="3" style="text-align:left;" | Total
| 183,346
| 100%
|-
| colspan="5" style="background-color:#E9E9E9;"|
|- style="font-weight:bold"
| colspan="4" |Source:
|
|}

Notes

References

Russian legislative constituencies
Politics of Irkutsk Oblast